The Man Who Sold Himself is a 1925 German silent crime drama film directed by Hans Steinhoff and starring Hans Mierendorff, Vivian Gibson and Olaf Fjord. It was shot at the Terra Studios in Berlin. The film's art direction was by Robert Neppach.

Cast
Hans Mierendorff as Jan Bracca
Vivian Gibson as Marion de L'Orme
Olaf Fjord as Achim von Wehrstädt
Nora Gregor as Daisy Bracca
Harry Lamberts-Paulsen as Chauffeur Plazceck
Bruno Kastner as Count Harden
Robert Garrison as theater director
Erich Kaiser-Titz as Coroner Korn
Helga Molander as Eva
Hermann Picha as office worker

References

External links

1925 films
Films of the Weimar Republic
German silent feature films
Films directed by Hans Steinhoff
Adultery in films
Terra Film films
German black-and-white films
1920s German films
Films shot at Terra Studios
1925 drama films
German drama films